Aenetus astathes is a moth of the family Hepialidae. It is known from Australia.

The larvae have been recorded feeding on Casuarina species. Adults have been recorded in February.

References

Moths described in 1915
Hepialidae